In mathematics, the symbolic method in invariant theory is an algorithm developed by Arthur Cayley, Siegfried Heinrich Aronhold, Alfred Clebsch, and Paul Gordan in the 19th century for computing  invariants of algebraic forms. It is based on treating the form as if it were a power of a degree one form, which corresponds to embedding a symmetric power of a vector space into the symmetric elements of a tensor product of copies of it.

Symbolic notation
The symbolic method uses a compact, but rather confusing and mysterious notation for invariants, depending on the introduction of new symbols a, b, c, ...  (from which the symbolic method gets its name) with apparently contradictory properties.

Example: the discriminant of a binary quadratic form
These symbols can be explained by the following example from Gordan. Suppose that 

is a binary quadratic form with an invariant given by the discriminant

The symbolic representation of the discriminant is 

where a and b are the symbols. The meaning of  the expression (ab)2 is as follows. First of all, (ab) is a shorthand form for the determinant of a matrix whose rows are a1, a2 and b1, b2, so 

Squaring this we get

Next we pretend that

so that

and we ignore the fact that this does not seem to make sense if f is not a power of a linear form. 
Substituting these values gives

Higher degrees
More generally if 

is a binary form of higher degree, then one introduces new variables a1, a2,  b1, b2, c1, c2, with the properties

What this means is that the following two vector spaces are naturally isomorphic:
The  vector space of homogeneous polynomials in A0,...An of degree m
The vector space of  polynomials in 2m variables a1, a2,  b1, b2, c1, c2, ... that have degree n in each of the m pairs of variables (a1, a2),  (b1, b2), (c1, c2), ... and are symmetric under permutations of the m symbols a, b, ....,
The isomorphism is given by mapping aa, bb, .... to Aj. This mapping does not preserve products of polynomials.

More variables

Symmetric products

The rather mysterious formalism of the symbolic method corresponds to embedding a symmetric product Sn(V) of a vector space V into a tensor product of n copies of V, as the elements preserved by the action of the symmetric group. In fact this is done twice, because the invariants of degree n of a quantic of degree m are the invariant elements of SnSm(V), which gets embedded into a tensor product of mn copies of V, as the elements invariant under a wreath product of the two symmetric groups. The brackets of the symbolic method are really invariant linear forms on this tensor product, which give invariants of SnSm(V) by restriction.

See also
Umbral calculus

References
 

Footnotes

Further reading
  pp. 32–7, "Invariants of n-ary forms: the symbolic method. Reprinted as 
 
 
 
 
 

Algebra
Invariant theory